Syed Najaf Hussain Shah (born 17 December 1984) is an international cricketer from Pakistan who now plays for Rawalpindi region and Pakistan International Airlines and various international franchise leagues. He has played his first One Day International game against Sri Lanka in Abu Dhabi, UAE in 2007. He is left-arm medium-fast bowler with ability to bat lower order. He has played 134 first-class cricket matches and taken over 477 wickets, with a career best of 7 for 57 for Pakistan International Airlines  against National Bank of Pakistan in the semi-final of the Patron's Trophy in 2004–05.Currently living in Dallas Texas USA

Early and personal life

Najaf belongs to Gujar Khan. He started his earlier career at school level with taped tennis ball,  it is quite normal in this part of world to start with tape/tennis ball rather than full cricket gear. Through initial school competitions he was spotted to be high potential talent. After completion of school education he took admission in Sarwar Shaheed College in intermediate level. He was selected captain of college cricket team, under his captaincy college's team won some major tournaments. In 2000-01 he moved to Rawalpindi from Gujar Khan for higher education. After moving to Rawalpindi he joined Gull Cricket Club and that was a turning point of his career and started cricket as a professional

Playing career

Pakistan national domestic matches
Najaf Shah has been playing First-class cricket in Pakistan since 2001. He has played for various teams but his major teams are Rawalpindi region and Pakistan International Airlines .  He has contributed to PIA and Rawalpindi cricket team success and his performances over the years helped the teams to win some of the major domestic championships title.

In February 2003, PIA won the championship title against Khan Research Laboratories cricket team, in final match Najaf grabbed 5 wickets,
again In 2004 /2005 ABN-AMRO trophy PIA shared championship title with HBL in rain effected final match and Najaf was declared best bowler of the tournament.

2014/15 season was also a good season for him,  he was declared best bowler of Quaid-e-Azam Trophy grabbing up 42 wickets in 8 matches with the best Avg 15.19 per wicket

International matches and tours
Najaf's international career started through ICC Under-17 Asia cup, it was played in Pakistan during 2000/2001 cricket season then he played for Pakistan U-19 and Pakistan A for few years. 
In 2007, he was selected for Pakistan cricket Academy team to tour Bangladesh for tri series tournament involving Bangladesh and Sri Lanka teams. This tour was helped him to make a strong case for national selectors he took 9 wicket in 4 One day matches in the tri series most by any bowler and then 16 wickets in two four day matches against Bangla Dash again most by any bowler and Pakistan Academy team won both matches team.

International cricket leagues and tournaments

Other contributions

Cricket talent selection duties, Najaf has been supporting regional selection committee to find fast bowlers for region and Pakistan

TV cricket analyst
Najaf is also well known cricket analyst in Pakistan, he is currently signed by Pakistan Television Corporation and Kay2 TV to cover major cricket events. Recently he has covered Pakistan Super League but in past he has been covering ICC tournaments

Awards and records
Man Of The Match of final and Highest Wicket Taker of the Liberty Cup Chicago 2017
Best bowler of US OPEN T20 tournament in Florida 2016 
Player of the match against Florida Strikers in US OPEN T20 Tournament 2016
Best bowler of QUAID-E- AZAM trophy 2014/15(National Tournament) 
Player Of the match against PTV in departmental T20 tournament 2013/14(National Tournament) 
Player of the match against Rawalpindi Rams in ABN-AMRO Cup 2007-08(National Tournament) 
Best bowler of Patrons Trophy 2004/05(National Tournament) 
Player of the match against Nepal In ICC U-17 Asia Cup 2000/2001

References

External links
 

1984 births
Living people
Rawalpindi cricketers
Pakistani cricketers
Pakistan One Day International cricketers
Pakistan International Airlines cricketers
Rawalpindi Rams cricketers
Quetta cricketers
Punjab (Pakistan) cricketers
People from Gujar Khan